In electromagnetism,  Ørsted's law, also spelled Oersted's law, is the physical law stating that an electric current creates a magnetic field.

This was discovered on 21 April 1820 by Danish physicist Hans Christian Ørsted (1777–1851), when he noticed that the needle of a compass next to a wire carrying current turned so that the needle was perpendicular to the wire. 
Ørsted investigated and found the physical law describing the magnetic field, now known as Ørsted's law. 
Ørsted's discovery was the first connection found between electricity and magnetism, and the first of two laws that link the two; the other is Faraday's law of induction. 
These two laws became part of the equations that govern electromagnetism, Maxwell's equations.

Ørsted's rules
Ørsted found that, for a straight wire carrying a steady direct current (DC):
The magnetic field lines encircle the current-carrying wire.
The magnetic field lines lie in a plane perpendicular to the wire.
If the direction of the current is reversed, the direction of the magnetic field reverses.
The strength of the field is directly proportional to the magnitude of the current.
The strength of the field at any point is inversely proportional to the distance of the point from the wire.

Direction of the magnetic field

The direction of the magnetic field at a point, the direction of the arrowheads on the magnetic field lines,  which is the direction that the "north pole" of the compass needle points, can be found from the current by the right-hand rule. If the right hand is wrapped around the wire so the thumb points in the direction of the current (conventional current, flow of positive charge), the fingers will curl around the wire in the direction of the magnetic field.

Vector form of the law 
The above rules can be generalized to give the modern vector form of Ørsted's law
The line integral of the magnetic field  around any closed curve  is proportional to the total current  passing through any surface bounded by the curve.
 
The law can be expressed in terms of the current density   through the surface  instead of the total current   through it

 where  is any surface spanning .

Ørsted's law only holds for steady currents, which don't change with time.  Therefore, it only holds for DC electric circuits, with no capacitors or inductors.  It can be seen that it fails for time varying currents by considering the case of a circuit consisting of a battery charging a capacitor through a resistor.  It can be verified experimentally that the current in this circuit creates a magnetic field, yet any closed curve encircling the conductor can be spanned by a surface passing between the capacitor plates, through which no current passes, from which the equation would give zero magnetic field.  Ørsted's law was modified by Maxwell to cover the case of time-varying currents by adding a new source term called displacement current, giving the Ampere–Maxwell equation.

Footnotes

References
F. W. Sears and M. W. Zemansky 1964 University Physics Third Edition (Complete Volume), Addison-Wesley Publishing Company, Inc. Reading, MA, LCCCN: 63-15265 (no ISBN).

Electromagnetism
Articles containing video clips